Kamilla Sofie Vallin (born 18 August 1993) is a Danish professional racing cyclist. In 2013, she won the Danish National Road Race Championships and took the silver medal at the Danish National Time Trial Championships. She rides for Team Rytger.

See also
 List of 2015 UCI Women's Teams and riders

References

External links
 

1993 births
Living people
Danish female cyclists
People from Gentofte Municipality
Sportspeople from the Capital Region of Denmark
21st-century Danish women